Look Blue Go Purple were a New Zealand alternative rock band from Dunedin, active from 1983 to 1987, recognised as part of the "second wave" of the Dunedin sound. Their first official show was at The Broome Valley Festival on 5 March 1983.

Members
 Kathy Bull – bass
 Norma O'Malley – keyboards, flute
 Lesley Paris – drums
 Denise Roughan – guitar
 Kath Webster – guitar

Careers after Look Blue Go Purple
After the band split up, Bull went on to Cyclops, and has since recorded a solo album, Some From the Sky, under her new name Francisca Griffin. Lesley Paris went on to Olla, and now works as station manager for community radio station Otago Access Radio in Dunedin. Denise Roughan went on to play with The 3Ds and Ghost Club. Norma O'Malley was a founding member of Chug. Paris also became manager of Flying Nun Records.

Discography

Featured compilations
The group have appeared on many compilations since 1986 in New Zealand. The following is a list of these albums that have featured tracks by Look Blue Go Purple.

 (1986) - Tuatara (Flying Nun Records) - "Circumspect Penelope"
 (1989) - In Love with These Times (Flying Nun Records) (FN028) - "Cactus Cat"
 (1991) - Getting Older 1981-1991 (Flying Nun Records) - "I Don't Want You Anyway"
 (1999) - Scarfies OST (Flying Nun Records) - "Cactus Cat"
 (2000) - But I Can Write Songs Okay (Yellow Eye Records) (EYE005-007) - "Ralta" (live version)
 (2012) - Time to Go: The Southern Psychedelic Moment 1981-1986 (Flying Nun Records) (FNLP518) - "As Does The Sun"

DVDs
 (2004) - Second Season - Flying Nun DVD II (Flying Nun Records) (FNDVD489) - "Circumspect Penelope"
 (2004) - Very Short Film (Flying Nun Records) - "Cactus Cat"

References

External links
Look Blue Go Purple on Flying Nun

New Zealand indie rock groups
All-female bands
Flying Nun Records artists
Dunedin Sound musical groups
1983 establishments in New Zealand